The Fourth Kind is a 2009 science fiction psychological horror thriller film directed by Olatunde Osunsanmi and featuring a cast of Milla Jovovich, Elias Koteas, Corey Johnson, Will Patton, Charlotte Milchard, Mia Mckenna-Bruce, Yulian Vergov, and Osunsanmi. The title is derived from the expansion of J. Allen Hynek's classification of close encounters with aliens, in which the fourth kind denotes alien abductions.

The film is a pseudodocumentary - purporting to be a dramatic re-enactment of true events that occurred in Nome, Alaska - in which a psychologist uses hypnosis to uncover memories of alien abduction from her patients, and finds evidence suggesting that she may have been abducted as well. At the beginning of the film, Jovovich informs the audience this entire movie is actually real, that she will be playing a character based on a real person named Abigail Tyler, and that the film will feature archival footage of the real Tyler. The "Abigail Tyler" seen in the archival footage is played by Charlotte Milchard, and at various points throughout the film, the archival footage scenes and accompanying dramatic re-enactments are presented side by side.

The film received negative reviews and grossed $47.7 million worldwide.

Plot
Chapman University hosts a televised interview with psychologist Dr. Abigail "Abbey" Tyler, who describes a series of events that occurred in Nome, Alaska that culminated in an alleged alien abduction in October 2000.

In a re-enactment of events occurring in August 2000, Abbey's husband, Will, is mysteriously murdered, leaving her to raise their two children, Ashley and Ronnie. Abbey tapes hypnotherapy sessions with patients with shared experiences of a white owl staring at them as they sleep before creatures attempt to enter their homes. Her first patient, Tommy Fisher, leaves in shock. That night, Abbey is called by the police to Tommy's house, where he holds his wife and two children at gunpoint. He states that he remembers everything and asks what "Zimabu Eter" means. Despite Abbey's pleas, he murders his family and commits suicide.

After hearing the similarities in their stories, Abbey suspects that these patients may have been victims of an alien abduction. There is evidence that she herself may have been abducted, when an assistant gives her a tape recorder which plays the sound of something entering her home and attacking her. The attacker speaks an unknown language and Abbey has no memory of the incident. Abel Campos, a colleague from Anchorage, is suspicious of the claims. Later, Abbey calls upon Dr. Awolowa Odusami, a specialist in ancient languages who was a contact of her late husband, to identify the mysterious language on the tape. Odusami identifies it as Sumerian.

Another patient, Scott, wishes to communicate. He admits that there was no owl and speaks of "them," but cannot remember anything further and begs Abbey to come to his home to hypnotize him. Under hypnosis, he suddenly jerks upright and begins hovering above his bed, while a voice speaking through Scott orders Abbey in Sumerian to immediately end her study. Later, Sheriff August arrives, telling her that Scott is completely paralyzed from the neck down. Believing Abbey is responsible, August tries to arrest her but Campos comes to her defense and confirms her story. August instead places her under guard inside her house.

Dash-cam footage of a police officer watching Abbey's house shows a large black triangular object flying into view. The image distorts, but the officer is heard describing people being pulled out of the house and calls for backup. Deputies rush into the house, finding Ronnie and Abbey, who says Ashley was taken. A disbelieving August accuses her of kidnapping Ashley and removes Ronnie from her custody.

Abbey undergoes hypnosis in an attempt to make contact with the beings responsible and reunite with her daughter. Campos and Odusami videotape the session. A hypnotized Abbey recalls that she witnessed Ashley's abduction and was also abducted herself. An alien presence communicates with her and Abbey begs for Ashley's return. It states Ashley will never come back before referring to itself as "God". When the encounter ends, Campos and Odusami rush over to the now unconscious Abbey and then notice something offscreen. The image distorts again as a voice yells "Zimabu Eter!" before resolving to show that all three are gone. Abbey wakes up in a hospital with a broken neck. August reveals that Will had committed suicide, and Abbey's belief that he was murdered was a delusion.

The re-enactment ends and, back in the present, Abbey states that she, Campos and Odusami were abducted during the hypnosis session but have no memory of their experiences. She is asked how anyone can take her claims of alien abduction seriously if she was proven to be delusional about her husband's death. Abbey states that she has no choice but to believe that Ashley is still alive. The interview ends as Abbey breaks down in tears.

An epilogue states that Abbey was cleared of all charges against her, left Alaska for the East Coast, and her health has deteriorated to the point of requiring constant care. Campos remains a psychologist and Odusami became a professor at a Canadian university. Both men, as well as August, refuses to be involved with the interview, while Ronnie remains estranged from Abbey and still blames her for Ashley's disappearance. Ashley herself was never found.

Cast

 Milla Jovovich as a re-enactment of Abbey Tyler
 Charlotte Milchard, credited only as "Nome resident", portrays the "real" Dr. Abigail Emily Tyler.
 Will Patton as Sheriff August
 Hakeem Kae-Kazim as Awolowa Odusami
 Corey Johnson as Tommy Fisher
 Enzo Cilenti as Scott Stracinsky
 Elias Koteas as Abel Campos

In addition, Jovovich provides opening and dialogue as herself, setting the pretext of the pseudo-documentary's "true" events; as a further pretext of the pseudo-documentary, "Dr. Abigail Emily Tyler" is shown in the closing tombstone credits as having "appeared" in the film. During the fictional "real" footage, the interviewer is played by the director-screenwriter of this entire endeavour, Olatunde Osunsanmi.

Production
This is the first major film by writer and director Olatunde Osunsanmi, who is a protégé of independent film director Joe Carnahan. The movie is set up as a re-enactment of allegedly original documentary footage. It also uses supposedly "never-before-seen archival footage" that is integrated into the film.

The Fourth Kind was shot in Bulgaria and Squamish, British Columbia, Canada. The lush, mountainous setting of Nome in the film bears little resemblance to the actual Nome, Alaska, which sits amidst the fringes of the arctic tree line, where trees can only grow about 8 ft tall due to the permafrost on the shore of the Bering Sea.

To promote the film, Universal Pictures created a website with fake news stories supposedly taken from real Alaska newspapers, including the Nome Nugget and the Fairbanks Daily News-Miner. The newspapers sued Universal, eventually reaching a settlement where Universal would remove the fake stories and pay $20,000 to the Alaska Press Club and a $2,500 contribution to a scholarship fund for the Calista Corporation.

Critical reception
The Fourth Kind received mainly negative reviews from critics. The film has an 18% rating on Rotten Tomatoes, based on 114 reviews. The site's consensus reads "While it boasts a handful of shocks, The Fourth Kind is hokey and clumsy and makes its close encounters seem eerily mundane."
 
Critic Roger Ebert gave it one and a half stars out of four, comparing it unfavorably to Paranormal Activity and The Blair Witch Project, while praising Milla Jovovich's acting.

According to the Anchorage Daily News, "Nomeites didn't much like the film exploiting unexplained disappearances of Northwest Alaskans, most of whom likely perished due to exposure to the harsh climate, as science fiction nonsense. The Alaska press liked even less the idea of news stories about unexplained disappearances in the Nome area being used to hype some "kind" of fake documentary".

Owen Gleiberman of Entertainment Weekly called the film "rote and listless."

CNN reviewer Breanna Hare criticized The Fourth Kind for "marketing fiction as truth". Nome, Alaska Mayor Denise Michels called it "Hollywood hooey". According to Michels, "people need to realize that this is a science fiction thriller". Michels also compared the film to The Blair Witch Project, saying, "we're just hoping the message gets out that this is supposed to be for entertainment."

References

External links
 
 
 

2009 films
2009 horror films
2009 science fiction films
Alien abduction films
2000s thriller films
American supernatural thriller films
American supernatural horror films
American psychological thriller films
American psychological horror films
American science fiction thriller films
American science fiction horror films
American horror thriller films
British supernatural thriller films
British supernatural horror films
British psychological thriller films
British psychological horror films
British science fiction thriller films
British science fiction horror films
British horror thriller films
Films about ancient astronauts
Films set in 2000
Films set in Alaska
Films set in Los Angeles
Films shot in British Columbia
Films shot in Bulgaria
Universal Pictures films
Films about extraterrestrial life
Alien invasions in films
Gold Circle Films films
Films produced by Joe Carnahan
Films scored by Atli Örvarsson
Films directed by Olatunde Osunsanmi
2000s English-language films
2000s American films
2000s British films